Droney is an Irish surname, derived from the Gaelic Ó Dróna, and originating from county Clare. Outside of Ireland, it's also prevalent in the U.S. An alternative theory says it is derived from the Middle English word drane, meaning drone, as in a male bee, and traces its origins to Yorkshire.

Notable people with this surname include:
 Christopher F. Droney (born 1954), American judge
 John Droney, American politician
 Daithí Ó Drónaí (born 1990), sometimes anglicised as Droney, Irish musician

References